Prasantt Ghosh (Assamese: প্রশান্ত ঘোষ born September 21, 1975) is an Indian fashion designer who works in various fashion shows and Assamese cinema. He is known for designing costumes in films like Suren Suror Putek, Bukur Majot Jawle, Khel, and has also designed dresses for opening and closing ceremonies of National Games of India held in Assam. Ghosh also runs a fashion designing and modeling institute named Assam Art and Designing Institute (AADI) in Guwahati, Assam, and works as a fashion choreographer.

Early life and career 
Prasantt Ghosh was born on 21 September 1975 and grew up in Guwahati, Assam. He studied fashion designing from the National Institute of Fashion Technology (NIFT). Ghosh started his career by opening a fashion designing institute in Assam called Assam Art and Designing Institute (AADI) and launched his fashion label named Prasantt Ghosh in 1996. By the year 1999, Prasantt started doing fashion week and many other government fashion events. In 2011, he won the 'Best Fashion Choreographer Award in Northeast'.

In 2016, Ghosh was invited as brand ambassador to the Asian Designer Week held in the Talkatora Stadium of New Delhi.

Prasantt has worked in shows all over India and countries including Bangladesh, Bhutan, Sri Lanka, Malaysia, Nepal and shot to fame after he choreographed Rubaru Mr. India Pageant-2017.

Awards and recognition 

 2011: Awarded the 'Best Fashion Choreographer of Northeast'
 2015: Received the 'Northeast Leadership Award' for his excellent service in the field of fashion, textile, and craftsmanship
 2016: Awarded the 'North East Leadership Award in 2016' along with Arnab Goswami and Zubeen Garg by the Cine Trust of India
 2017: Selected to Style & Design the prestigious 'the Supermodel International' in New Delhi
 2018: Won 'Lifetime achievement award' from the wife of the Governor of Assam

See also 
 List of fashion designers
 Fashion in India
 Bhanu Athaiya

References

External links 
 Official website

Living people
1975 births
Indian fashion designers
Indian costume designers
Artists from Assam
Textile designers
Fashion labels from India
Indian male fashion designers
National Institute of Fashion Technology alumni
People from Assam
21st-century Indian designers